WAGO may refer to:

 WAGO GmbH & Co. KG, a German manufacturing company
 WAGO (FM), a radio station (88.7 FM) licensed to Snow Hill, North Carolina, United States
 Wago (和語), native Japanese vocabulary
 Wago, Icelandic music band